Oisis Sediles is a Nicaraguan footballer who plays as a left-back for CD Águilas de León and the Nicaragua women's national team.

Early life
Sediles was born in León.

Club career
Sediles has played for CD Águilas de León in Nicaragua.

International career
Sediles made her senior debut for Nicaragua on 11 April 2021 as a half-time substitution in a 3–1 friendly away win over El Salvador.

References 

Living people
Sportspeople from León, Nicaragua
Nicaraguan women's footballers
Women's association football fullbacks
Nicaragua women's international footballers
Year of birth missing (living people)